Grand Haven Charter Township is a charter township of Ottawa County in the U.S. state of Michigan.  The population was 15,178 at the 2010 census. The Grand Haven Township is located immediately south of Grand Haven.

Communities 
 Agnew is an unincorporated village in this Township near the junction of US 31 and M-45.

Geography

Demographics
As of the census of 2000, there were 13,278 people, 4,609 households, and 3,811 families residing in the township. The racial makeup of the Township was 97.15% White, 0.12% African American, 0.35% Native American, 0.56% Asian, 0.01% Pacific Islander, 0.67% from other races, and 1.14% from two or more races. Hispanic or Latino of any race were 1.90% of the population.

There were 4,609 households, out of which 44.3% had children under the age of 18 living with them, 72.1% were married couples living together, 7.5% had a female householder with no husband present, and 17.3% were non-families. 13.8% of all households were made up of individuals, and 4.4% had someone living alone who was 65 years of age or older.  The average household size was 2.87 and the average family size was 3.16.

In the Township the population was spread out, with 30.4% under the age of 18, 6.6% from 18 to 24, 29.8% from 25 to 44, 25.0% from 45 to 64, and 8.2% who were 65 years of age or older.  The median age was 36 years. For every 100 females, there were 100.2 males.  For every 100 females age 18 and over, there were 96.8 males.

The median income for a household in the Township was $62,380, and the median income for a family was $68,237. Males had a median income of $48,389 versus $28,520 for females. The per capita income for the Township was $25,025.  About 1.0% of families and 2.2% of the population were below the poverty line, including 1.2% of those under age 18 and 3.2% of those age 65 or over.

Major highways
 bisects the Township from north to south, running from Grand Haven to the north and Holland to the south.

Sports

Grand Haven Golf Club

References

External links
Grand Haven Charter Township

Townships in Ottawa County, Michigan
Charter townships in Michigan